Stagestruck: Theater, Aids, and the Marketing of Gay America is a non-fiction book by lesbian writer Sarah Schulman. The book examines the similarities between her novel People in Trouble and Jonathan Larson's award-winning musical Rent.

Content 
Schulman takes the reader on a behind-the-scenes tour of New York's theatre culture providing a glimpse into the power structure that makes up the theatre and media scene as she depicts her fight for compensation from the estate of Jonathan Larson, whose award-winning musical Rent shares many characters and situations with her novel People in Trouble, a novel she published in 1991 and that Jonathan Larson read and was familiar with prior to writing Rent.

Through her journey and her struggle for justice she discovers that she is not alone. Schulman learns that there many mainstream artists who "borrow" material from lesser-known artist and go on to be successful and win awards, but who fail to provide even the smallest mention of the origin of their work. She also learns that there are many neglected works and performances that provide a more accurate depiction of LGBT lifestyle than mainstream artists.

Award and nominations 
Stagestruck won and was nominated for multiple awards including the 1999 Stonewall Non-Fiction Book Award, the 1999 Israel Fishman Non-Fiction Award and was nominated for the 1998 Lambda Literary Award for Lesbian Studies and 1998 Lambda Literary Award for Drama.

Publication 
Stagestruck was published on September 24, 1998, by Duke University Press.

References 

1998 non-fiction books
1990s LGBT literature
American non-fiction books
Stonewall Book Award-winning works
LGBT literature in the United States
HIV/AIDS in literature
Duke University Press books